Alfredo Ángel Martín (30 April 1894 – 24 October 1955) was an Argentine footballer who played as forward. Martín started his career in Hispano Argentino, then playing in River Plate, Tigre, and Boca Juniors. where he finished his career in 1923. 

Martín won a total of 9 titles in his career, 1 with River Plate and 8 with Boca Juniors, where he played 77 matches scoring 30 goals.

Martín also played in ten matches for the Argentina national football team from 1917 to 1919. He was also part of Argentina's squad for the 1917 South American Championship.

Titles
River Plate
 Tie Cup (1): 1914

Boca Juniors
 Primera División (3): 1919, 1920, 1923
 Copa de Competencia Jockey Club (1): 1919
 Copa Ibarguren (2): 1919, 1923
 Tie Cup (1): 1919
 Copa de Honor Cousenier (1): 1920

References

External links
 

1894 births
1955 deaths
Argentine footballers
Argentina international footballers
Place of birth missing
Association football forwards